Waun-oer is a mountain in Snowdonia, North Wales, situated approximately four miles to the south-west of Aran Fawddwy. It is one of the peaks in the Dyfi hills, a subgroup of the Cadair Idris group. It is a top of Maesglase and the summit consists of a trig point that crowns an uneven grassy plateau. It is connected to Cribin Fawr to the east and Mynydd Ceiswyn to the south. To the north lies Cadair Idris, while Tarren y Gesail lies to the west.

References

External links
 www.geograph.co.uk : photos of Maesglase and surrounding area

Brithdir and Llanfachreth
Corris
Mountains and hills of Gwynedd
Mountains and hills of Snowdonia
Hewitts of Wales
Nuttalls
Dyfi Hills